Ptahhotep is an ancient Egyptian theophoric name. Notable bearers were:
Ptahhotep, vizier of the 5th Dynasty, and purported author of The Maxims of Ptahhotep;
Ptahhotep Desher, vizier of the 5th Dynasty;
Ptahhotep (Djedkare) vizier of the 5th Dynasty, perhaps brother of the above;
Ptahhotep Tjefi, vizier of the 5th Dynasty, grandson of Ptahhotep.

Ancient Egyptian given names
Theophoric names